Ziya Selçuk (born 1 May 1961) is a Turkish politician and educator. He is the former Minister of National Education. He was formerly a professor of education at Gazi University.

Early life and education
Selçuk was born on 1 Mayıs 1961 in Emirler village in  Gölbaşı, Ankara. He graduated from Ankara University Faculty of Educational Sciences, subsequently completing his master's degree in developmental psychology. In 1989, he completed his doctoral studies at Hacettepe University, on guidance and psychological counseling. He was promoted to associate professorship and professorship at Gazi University Faculty of Education.

Education career 
Selçuk acted as a faculty member for multiple Turkish universities, including TED University. He has acted as the chairman of the Head Council of Education and Morality between 21 March 2003 and 8 May 2008, overseeing the curriculum reform during this time. As a part of the negotiations for the accession of Turkey to the European Union, he has represented the country on the topics of science and education.

Political career
On 10 July 2018, Selçuk became the  Minister of National Education. On 5 August 2021, he announced that he would resign from the position. His resignation was approved on the following day through a decree published in T.C. Resmî Gazete, and he was replaced by Mahmut Özer.

References

Living people
1961 births
People from Emirler, Gölbaşı
Ministers of National Education of Turkey
Politicians from Ankara
Ankara University alumni
Hacettepe University alumni
Academic staff of Gazi University
Members of the 66th government of Turkey